Breathing Space is the debut solo album by UK keyboardist Iain Jennings. Although this album was originally released as Iain Jennings's album, it has become known as Breathing Space's (the band that was created for the following tour) first album because of the subsequent tours and the follow-up album Coming Up for Air in 2007.

Track listing

"Forgive or Surrender" (Jennings) - 5:06
"I've Been Thinking" (Jennings) - 5:06
"Shades of Grey" (Jennings) - 5:10
"No Promises" (Jennings) - 4:40
"Man Made Circles" (Jennings) - 7:06
"Wasted All the Time" (Jennings) - 6:03
"Belief" (Jennings/Sparnenn) - 5:42
"You Still Linger" (Jennings) - 8:36
"Escape" (Jennings) - 8:11

Credits (directly from Sleeve Notes)

Iain Jennings - keyboards, synthesizers, programming

Additional personnel
Olivia Sparnenn - lead/backing vocals (Tracks 1,2,3,4,6,7 and 8)
Liam Davison - lead/rhythm/acoustic guitars, bass guitars
Bryan Josh - guitar solos (4 and 8)
Andrew Jennings - drums, percussion

2005 albums
Breathing Space albums